Syed Tareq Hussain awc, psc is a Major General of Bangladesh Army and currently posted as Senior Directing Staff (Army) at National Defence College. Prior to that, he was Commandant of Bangladesh Ordnance Factory.

Career 
Hussain served in the Bangladesh Army headquarters in charge of Inspection, Research & Technical Development Directorate with the rank of Brigadier General in 2020. In December 2020, he was promoted to Major General and appointed General officer commanding of the 19th Infantry Division based in Shahid Salahuddin Cantonment. He was a member of the Central Committee of Proyash.

On 27 March 2021, Hussain hosted Indian veterans of the Bangladesh Liberation war at Shahid Salahuddin Cantonment in Ghatail. He is the Chief Patron of Ghatail Cantonment English School.

References 

Living people
Bangladesh Army generals
1969 births